Dorothy Nomzansi Nyembe (December 31, 1931 – December 17, 1998) was a South African activist and politician.

Biography 
Born near Dundee, KwaZulu-Natal, Nyembe was the daughter of Leeya Basolise Nyembe, whose father was Chief Ngedee Shezi. She attended mission schools until Standard 9. She had her only child when she was fifteen.

Nyembe spent much of her life under apartheid either under banning orders or in prison, serving terms from 1963 to 1966 for furthering the ANC movement. Again from 1968 until 1983 for harboring terrorists. Nyembe joined the Natal Organisation of Women (NOW) after her 1984 release. She was again released from detention in 1987. She was elected to the National Assembly in 1994.

Career
Nyembe was merchant but was also active in politics, participating or running many progressive organizations. She joined the African National Congress in 1952 and soon became an active member. When she joined the ANC the Defiance campaign was going on. Nyembe was imprisoned in 1952 for defying unjust laws. She led women from Natal in the Defiance Campaign of 1956. Part of the Defiance Campaign was being a leader against the removal of the Cato Manor in 1956. In 1956 she was elected as the vice president of the Durban ANC. She was also active in the movement to boycott beer halls. Beer Halls, taking jobs away from many women. In 1959 she was elected president of the Natal division of the African National Congress Women's League. When the ANC was banned in 1960, she joined Spear of the Nation. In 1961, Nyembe was recruited into the Umkhonto we Sizwe and worked with a number of allies such as Chief Albert Luthuli, Moses Mabhida, Nelson Mandela, Walter Sisulu and Oliver Tambo." In 1963 she led women during the Natal Women's Revolt. "She was released on 23 March 1984, after her release, Nyembe started working for Natal Organisation of Women (NOW). NOW served a number of purposes. Fighting against rent increases, transport costs, poor education and lack of child care facilities are the main focus of the organization."

Work for the African National Congress
The ANC's philosophy during the early 1950s was that of Gandhi's. A passive philosophy where members were willing to go to prison if necessary. Nyembe, while not a pacifist, joined the ANC and in 1952 was willing to break laws that imposed restrictions of political, labour and residential rights. Nyembe's time in the defiance campaign ended when, in 1953, the British passed  laws that banned protest meetings. After her election president of the Natal division in 1959 Nyembe was involved in the planning of opposition to pass laws. Pass laws would have made it required that all black citizens carry an identity card around in white areas. After the  Sharpeville massacre and the ANC and the PAC being banned under newly passed the Unlawful Organisations Act. Nyembe joined a violent wing of the ANC called the spear of nation. Under this operation she participated in sabotaging government facilities.

Natal Women's Revolt
As a leader of the Natal Women's Revolt, Nyembe was with other South African black women against beer halls. Beer Halls took a major source of income away from women. This organization also sought the destruction of the Durban Corporation property. Nyembe was fighting for influx control, passes for women, and permits to seek work.

Awards

Awarded FAO Ceres Medal in 1976.

During her career she received the Order of Friendship of Peoples, from the Soviet Union, and the Chief Albert Luthuli prize, the latter in 1992.

References

1931 births
1998 deaths
Anti-apartheid activists
South African women activists
South African activists
African National Congress politicians
People from Umzinyathi District Municipality
Members of the National Assembly of South Africa
20th-century South African women politicians
20th-century South African politicians
Recipients of the Order of Friendship of Peoples
UMkhonto we Sizwe personnel
Women members of the National Assembly of South Africa
Women civil rights activists